Central Finance Company PLC is one of the oldest non-bank financial institutions (NBFIs) in Sri Lanka having founded in 1957. The company is listed on the Colombo Stock Exchange in 1969. Brand Finance ranked the company the 28th most valuable brand in Sri Lanka for the year 2021. Central Finance Company was ranked 44th in the LMD 100 for the fiscal year 2019/20 by LMD.

History
Central Finance Company was founded in 1957 in Kandy by Chandra Wijenaike. The company was listed on the Colombo Stock Exchange in 1969. The company acquired a 90.1 per cent stake in Isuru Leasing, a small-scale finance company based in Kandy in November 2014. This was carried out as part of the plan of consolidating the financial services sector by the Central Bank of Sri Lanka.

Operations
Central Finance Company is one of the licensed finance companies, authorised to accept deposits from the public by the Central Bank of Sri Lanka. The company's main business activities include leasing, hire purchase financing, deposit mobilization and providing other financial services. The company received an A+ rating from Fitch Ratings in 2019. The company owns a number of subsidiaries including Central Industries PLC and Kandy Private Hospitals (Pvt) Ltd. The company also has invested in Nations Trust Bank (owns a stake of 21.38%), Tea Smallholders Factories PLC (29.30%), and Capital Suisse Asia Ltd (24.58%). However, the Monetary Board of Central Bank has asked both John Keells Holdings and Central Finance Company to reduce their stakes in the Nations Trust Bank to a maximum of 20% at the end of 2021 and 15% at the end of 2022.

See also
 List of Sri Lankan public corporations by market capitalisation

References

External links
 Official website

1957 establishments in Ceylon
Companies listed on the Colombo Stock Exchange
Financial services companies of Sri Lanka
Financial services companies established in 1957